The Kössen Formation is a Late Triassic (Rhaetian-age) geological formation in the Northern Calcareous Alps of Austria and Germany, in the Tiroler-Lech Nature Park. During the Late Triassic, the area now occupied by the Northern Calcareous Alps was instead a long, passive coastline at the western tip of the Neotethys Ocean. The environment was initially dominated by a wide and shallow carbonate platform within a lagoon between the shore and a string of reefs. This carbonate platform is nowadays preserved as the Carnian to Norian-age Hauptdolomit and Dachstein Formation. The Kössen Formation represents a period of increased siliciclastic clay input into the lagoon, covering up the carbonate platform with marls and marly limestones instead of pure limestone or dolomite. The Eiberg Member of the Kössen Formation was deposited in the Eiberg basin, a narrow strip of deeper water which developed between the carbonate platform and the shoreline in the later part of the Rhaetian.

See also 
 List of fossiliferous stratigraphic units in Austria
 List of fossiliferous stratigraphic units in Germany
 List of fossiliferous stratigraphic units in Switzerland

References

External links 
 
 

Geologic formations of Austria
Geologic formations of Germany
Geologic formations of Switzerland
Triassic System of Europe
Triassic Austria
Triassic Germany
Triassic Switzerland
Geology of the Alps